Rule-set-based access control (RSBAC) is an open source access control framework for current Linux kernels, which has been in stable production use since January 2000 (version 1.0.9a).

Features
 Free open source GNU General Public License (GPL) Linux kernel security extension
 Independent of governments and big companies
 Several well-known and new security models, e.g. mandatory access control (MAC), access control list (ACL), and role compatibility (RC)
 On-access virus scanning with Dazuko interface
 Detailed control over individual user and program network accesses
 Fully access controlled kernel level user management
 Any combination of security models possible
 Easily extensible: write your own model for runtime registration
 Support for latest kernels
 Stable for production use
 Easily portable to other operating systems

The RSBAC system architecture has been derived and extended from the Generalized Framework for Access Control (GFAC) by Marshall Abrams and Leonard La Padula.

RSBAC means "ruleset based access control" and is also a role-based access control (RBAC) solution. The two acronyms can cause confusion.

In his essay "Rule Set Modeling of a Trusted Computer System", Leonard LaPadula describes how the Generalized Framework for Access Control (GFAC) approach could be implemented in the UNIX System V operating system. He introduced the clear separation between Access Enforcement Facility (AEF), Access Decision Facility (ADF) with Access Control Rules (ACR), and Access Control Information (ACI).

The AEF as part of the system call function calls the ADF, which uses ACI and the rules to return a decision and a set of new ACI attribute values. The decision is then enforced by the AEF, which also sets the new attribute values and, in case of allowed access, provides object access to the subject.

This structure requires all security relevant system calls to be extended by AEF interception, and it needs a well-defined interface between AEF and ADF. For better modeling, a set of request types was used in which all system call functionalities were to be expressed. The general structure of the GFAC has also been included in the ISO standard 10181-3 Security frameworks for open systems: Access control framework and into The Open Group standard Authorization (AZN) API.

The first RSBAC prototype followed La Padula's suggestions and implemented some access control policies briefly described there, namely mandatory access control (MAC), functional control (FC) and Security Information Modification (SIM), as well as the Privacy Model by Simone Fischer-Hübner.

Many aspects of the system have changed a lot since then, e.g. the current framework supports more object types, includes generic list management and network access control, contains several additional security models, and supports runtime registration of decision modules and system calls for their administration.

RSBAC and other solutions 
RSBAC is very close to Security-Enhanced Linux (SELinux), as they share a lot more in their design than other access controls such as AppArmor.

However, RSBAC brings its own hooking code instead of relying on the Linux Security Module (LSM). Due to this, RSBAC is technically a replacement for LSM itself, and implement modules that are similar to SELinux, but with additional functionality.

The RSBAC framework incorporates complete object status and has a full knowledge of the kernel state when making decisions, making it more flexible and reliable. However, this comes at the cost of slightly higher overhead in the framework itself. Although SELinux- and RSBAC-enabled systems have similar impact on performance, LSM impact alone is negligible compared to the RSBAC framework alone.

For this reason, LSM has been selected as default and unique security-hooking mechanism in the Linux kernel, RSBAC coming as a separate patch only.

History 
RSBAC was the first Linux role-based access control (RBAC) and mandatory access control (MAC) patch.

See also

External links
RSBAC homepage
Leonard LaPadula's essay on GFAC
Gentoo Wiki Access Control Comparison Table

Operating system security
Linux security software
Linux kernel features
Access control